First Officer Madeleine Victorine Bayard (21 February 1911 — 1 January 1943), who served as Madeleine Barclay aboard  on agent-running operations into Vichy France, was a French agent of the Special Operations Executive during World War II. She was lost, with the rest of the crew, when the ship was sunk in 1943.

Biography
Madeleine Victorine Bayard was born in Paris in 1911, the daughter of Adele Suzanne Bayard (father unknown). There are also references to Madeleine Guesclin, a play on her surname as both du Guesclin and Bayard were famous warriors in medieval France. She served on the French merchant vessel Le Rhin. After the fall of France, in 1940, the ship escaped to Britain and was accepted for service with SOE. The ship was therefore re-commissioned as HMS Fidelity and the French crew inducted into the Royal Navy. Because members of the crew had families in occupied Europe they adopted pseudonyms, thus Madeleine Barclay. Barclay was the mistress of Fidelity'''s commanding officer, Claude Andre Michel Peri (Jack Langlais).

Bayard was commissioned into the "Wrens", the Women's Royal Naval Service ,  (WRNS) becoming a First Officer (equivalent to a Lieutenant commander). She attended her WRNS Officers' Training Course at the Royal Naval College, Greenwich in January 1941, before rejoining her ship on operations for SOE. At the time, it was extremely rare for a Wren, whether rating or officer, to serve afloat.

In November 1942, the Allies landed in French North Africa and the Germans occupied Vichy France as a precaution. It was no longer appropriate to continue the operations to this part of France. However, a new role was considered for HMS Fidelity in the Far East. Large enough to carry her own motor torpedo boats (MTBs) and spotter aircraft, she was ideal as an offshore base to mount Commando operations on Japanese-held coasts in South-East Asia. A company (in reality, more a Troop) of 40(RM) Commando was embarked and Fidelity set off on her new mission, joining a convoy for the dangerous initial part of the voyage through the North Atlantic.

There were reports of survivors of the sinking, but Fidelity had herself been rescuing other survivors and was far behind the convoy. A detached Motor Torpedo Boat reached safety, but otherwise all hands were lost.

A biography Claude and Madeleine: A True Story of War, Espionage and Passion'' by Edward Marriott was published in 2005.

Awards

References

 

1911 births
1943 deaths
Military personnel from Paris
Women's Royal Naval Service officers
French Special Operations Executive personnel
Special Operations Executive personnel killed in World War II
Graduates of the Royal Naval College, Greenwich
Royal Navy officers of World War II
Royal Navy personnel killed in World War II
Royal Navy officers